Hitopadesha (Sanskrit: हितोपदेशः, IAST: Hitopadeśa, "Beneficial Advice") is an Indian text in the Sanskrit language consisting of fables with both animal and human characters. It incorporates maxims, worldly wisdom and advice on political affairs in simple, elegant language, and the work has been widely translated.

Little is known about its origin. The surviving text is believed to be from the 12th-century, but was probably composed by Narayana between 800 and 950 CE. The oldest manuscript found in Nepal has been dated to the 14th century, and its content and style has been traced to the ancient Sanskrit treatises called the Panchatantra from much earlier.

The author and his sources
The authorship of the Hitopadesa has been contested. 19th-century Indologists attributed the text to Vishnu Sharma, a narrator and character that often appears in its fables. Upon the discovery of the oldest known manuscript of the text in Nepal, dated to 1373, and the preparation of a critical edition, scholars generally accept the authority of its two concluding verses. These verses mention Narayana as the author and a king called Dhavala Chandra as the patron of the text. But as no other work by this author is known, and since the ruler mentioned has not been traced in other sources, we know almost nothing of either of them. Dating the work is therefore problematic. There are quotations within it from 8th century works and other internal evidence may point to an East Indian origin during the later Pala Empire (8th-12th century).

Narayana says that the purpose of creating the work is to encourage proficiency in Sanskrit expression (samskrita-uktishu) and knowledge of wise behaviour (niti-vidyam). This is done through the telling of moral stories in which birds, beasts and humans interact. Interest is maintained through the device of enclosed narratives in which a story is interrupted by an illustrative tale before resuming. The style is elaborate and there are frequent pithy verse interludes to illustrate the points made by the various speakers. On account of these, which provide by far the greater part of the text, the work has been described as an anthology of (sometimes contradictory) verses from widespread sources relating to statecraft.

The Hitopadesha is quite similar to the ancient Sanskrit classic, the Panchatantra, another collection of fables with morals. Both have an identical frame story, although the Hitopadesha differs by having only four divisions to the ancient text's five. According to Ludwik Sternbach's critical edition of the text, the Panchatantra is the primary source of some 75% of the Hitopadesha'''s content, while a third of its verses can be traced to the Panchatantra. In his own introductory verses, Narayana acknowledges that he is indebted to the Panchatantra  and 'another work'. The latter is unknown but may possibly be the Dharmasastras or some other.

 Contents 

The Hitopadesha is organized into four books, with a preface section called Prastavika. The opening verse expresses reverence to the Hindu god Ganesha and goddess Saraswati. There are several versions of the text available, though the versions are quite similar unlike other ancient and medieval era Hindu texts wherein the versions vary significantly. The shortest version has 655 verses, while the longest has 749 verses. In the version translated by Wilkins, the first book of Hitopadesha has nine fables, the second and third each have ten, while the fourth has thirteen fables.

Book 1 Mitralabha: How to gain a friend
The Book 1 is introduced with the statement that wise and sincere friends may be poor or destitute, but it is they who may help one achieve successes in life. The book recommends that the good find good friends, they are like a vessel in which one deposits both joys and sorrows of life, and it is not words that define a friend but their behavior and actions.

Book 2 Suhrdbheda: How to lose a friend
The Book 2 is introduced with the statement that great friendships can be destroyed by the cruel and envious beings who envy such friendship. The book states that misinformation creates wedge between friends, as does a focus on disagreements, rash action without due investigation and a lack of communication.

Book 3 Vigraha: War
The third book presents a series of fables wherein war is described as a consequence of greed, criticism of others, wicked people and their ideologies, cruel and ungrateful leader, lack of restraint, lack of preparation, poor fortifications, weak military, weak diplomacy, and poor counsel.

Book 4 Sandhi: Peace
The fables in Book 4 state that it is always better to seek peace with seven types of people: the truthful, the virtuous, the just, the strong, the victorious, those with many brothers, and the self-destructing worthless. Peace can be achieved, states Hitopadesha, if one examines one's own behavior and one's own seeking as much as that of the opponent, pays attention to the counsel of one's good friends, treats the opponent with respect and understanding that is in tune with the opponent's character, forms one or more of sixteen types of treaties, reciprocal assistance and cooperative ventures between the two sides thereby enabling the pursuit of truth.

Closing
The text ends with the following,

 Translations 
By the early 20th-century, translations of the Hitopadesha into the following Indian languages were known:
Eastern states of India: Bangla, Odiya
Western states: Gujarati
Central states: Marathi
Northern states: Hindi, Newari, Urdu
Southern states: Kannada, Malayalam, Tamil, Telugu

The text has also been widely translated under different titles into Asian languages such as Burmese, Khmer, Thai, Malay, Persian, Sinhala, as well as into Dutch, English, French, German, Greek, Spanish and Russian.

Akbar (1542–1605) commended the work of translating the Hitopadesha to his own minister, Abul Fazl, with the suggestion that the poems which often interrupt the narrative should be abridged. Fazl accordingly put the book into a familiar style and published it with explanations under the title of the Criterion of Wisdom.

The Hitopadesha was also a favourite among the scholars of the British Raj. It was the first Sanskrit book to be printed in the Nagari script, when it was published by William Carey in Serampore in 1803–4, with an introduction by Henry Colebrooke. This was followed by several later editions during the 19th century, including Max Müller's of 1884, which contains an interlinear literal translation.

Much earlier, Sir William Jones encountered the work in 1786 and it was translated into English the following year by Charles Wilkins, who had also made the earliest English translation of the Bhagavad Gita. A later translation by Edwin Arnold, then Principal of Puna College, was published in London in 1861 under the title The Book of Good Counsels.

See also

 Panchatantra''
 List of Panchatantra Stories

References

Further reading 
 Max Müller (1884), Book I, Books II,III,IV (alt)
 Lakshmīnarayaṇa Ṣarman (1830), Hitopadesha by Vishnusarma, English translation with Sanskrit and Bengali versions, Harvard University archives
 Edwin Arnold (1861), Hitopadesa: The Book of Good Counsels, Columbia University archives
 
 Judit Törzsök (2007), “Friendly Advice” and “King Víkrama’s Adventures”, New York University, facing translation as part of the Clay Sanskrit Library series. (The translation of the Hitopadesha is "Friendly Advice", the first part of the book)

Sanskrit texts
Indian folklore
Political history of India